The Bisnumati River (Nepal Bhasa:), flowing in the Kathmandu Valley,  originates at Tokha on Shivapuri Mountain, north of Kathmandu. It flows through the western part of old Kathmandu city. It is a holy river for both Hindu and Buddhist people. Literally, Bishnumati means the beloved river of Lord Vishnu. Sobha Baghwati and Indrayani along with Kankeshowri  temple - a few of the holiest places of the Kathmandu Valley are on the opposite banks of this river.  Karbir Masan, a revered cemetery is also on the bank of this river. the tributaries of this river are Sapanatirtha Khola, Sangle Khola, Lhora Khola and Binap fall. Bisnap fall locates at the Shivapuri National Park just above the Muhan Pokhari.

Bishnumati is one of the very important rivers of the valley. It provides water for drinking, cultivating agriculture and ritual purposes of the local citizens. It has rich ritual cultural values. But from last 35 years it has been used as a dumping site. Encroachment on the river with diversion of its water has occurred. For that surrounding environment should be improved. That is the river side improvement and demand of greenery development by bioengineering system to be needed today

The 1500-year history of funerary architecture in the Kathmandu valley is some of the finest examples of stone architecture found on the subcontinent. A caitya is placed in almost all courtyards in cities like Patan.

References

External links
Planned and sustainable Development of Bisnumati River Corrider
Bishnumati River Improvement Programme

Rivers of Bagmati Province